= Guam Discovery Day =

Guamanian holiday

Guam History and Chamorro Heritage Day
- Observed by: Guam
- Date: First Monday in March
- 2024 date: March 4
- 2025 date: March 3
- 2026 date: March 2
- 2027 date: March 1
- Frequency: annual

Guam History and Chamorro Heritage Day is a public holiday in Guam, celebrating the discovery of the island. It has been held on the first Monday of March each year since 1970 in commemoration of the anniversary of the discovery of Guam in 1521. On March 6, 2001, Guam celebrated the 480th anniversary of the discovery of Guam.
